Pretoria, an American schooner barge, was one of the largest wooden ships ever constructed. She was 103 meters (338 ft) long, had a beam of 13.4 meters (44 ft), and 7 meters (23 ft) in depth. She was built by James Davidson in West Bay City, Michigan, for use on the Great Lakes.

To strengthen her wooden frame and hull, Pretoria was constructed using steel keelson plates, steel chords, and steel arches. She also was strapped diagonally with steel. She needed a donkey engine to run a pump to keep her interior dry.

The Saginaw, Michigan newspaper "The Courier-Herald" described "Pretoria"'s launch on July 26, 1900 in the following way:

 
On 1 September 1905, Pretoria took on cargo at a pier in Superior, Wisconsin. Another notable ship, the lake freighter Sevona, took on cargo at the same pier shortly after Pretoria. Both ships sank the very next day near the Apostle Islands when a legendary gale sent them to the bottom of Lake Superior.

Notes

1900 ships
Schooner barges
Three-masted ships
Barges of the United States
Maritime incidents in 1905
Shipwrecks of Lake Superior
Shipwrecks on the National Register of Historic Places in Wisconsin
National Register of Historic Places in Ashland County, Wisconsin
National Register of Historic Places in Bayfield County, Wisconsin
Ships built by James Davidson
Schooners of the United States